Méav is the debut album of Irish musician Méav Ní Mhaolchatha. It was released in Ireland in 1998 under the label K-tel. It was released in the USA on February 8, 2000 under the label Hearts of Space and again in 2006 by Manhattan Records. The album was recorded at The Works in Dublin, Ireland.

The album was re-released in 2006 under the title Celtic Woman Presents: Méav by Manhattan Records.

Track listing 
Original Release:

US Release:

In the US release of the album, The Death of Queen Jane replaced Dante's Prayer and the tracks were ordered differently.

Personnel

Musicians
David Adams - Harpsichord
David Agnew - Oboe, cor anglais, recorder
Aontas Choral Group - Choir
Mark Armstrong - Keyboards
David Downes - Keyboards
Brian Fleming - Bodhrán, drums
Frank Gallagher - Fiddle, viola, whistle
Ivan Gilliland - Guitar
Eunan McDonald - Backing vocals, mouth percussion
Méav - Vocals, harp, keyboards
Geraint Roberts - Bass
Andrew Robinson - Viol
Richard Sweeney - Lute

Technical
Mark Armstrong - Programming
Paul Ashe-Brown - Engineer
Bobby Boughton - Mastering
Tony Harris - Engineer
Stephen Hill - Mastering
Bob Olhsson - Mastering

References

1998 debut albums
Méav Ní Mhaolchatha albums
Albums by Irish artists